Halimolobos jaegeri is a species of flowering plant in the family Brassicaceae known by the common names Mojave fissurewort, or Mojave halimolobos. It is native to the Mojave Desert and nearby mountain ranges of California and Nevada. It grows in rocky areas, such as the limestone cliffs and slopes of the desert mountains.

This is a slightly woolly perennial plant growing many branching herbaceous stems to 20 to 60 centimeters in height. The slender erect stems bear occasional lobed, ruffled leaves up to 6 centimeters long. At the tips of stem branches are dense, fuzzy inflorescences of small white-petalled flowers with six protruding stamens. The fruit is a hairy silique one or two centimeters long containing many tiny seeds.

External links
Jepson Manual Treatment
USDA Plants Profile
Photo gallery

Brassicaceae
Flora of the California desert regions
Flora of Nevada
Endemic flora of the United States
Natural history of the Mojave Desert
Flora without expected TNC conservation status